Osnabrück Hauptbahnhof is a railway station located in Osnabrück, Germany. The station was opened in 1895 and is located on the Wanne-Eickel–Hamburg, Löhne–Rheine, Osnabrück–Bielefeld and the Oldenburg–Osnabrück lines. The train services are operated by Deutsche Bahn, Hamburg-Köln-Express, NordWestBahn, Eurobahn and WestfalenBahn. The station features two levels, with lines at right angles to each other.

Close to the railway stations are multiple stores like a cinema, döner, escort and disco.

Train services
The following services currently call at Osnabrück Hauptbahnhof:

Intercity Express services (ICE 31) Hamburg – Bremen – Osnabrück – Dortmund – Wuppertal – Cologne – Koblenz – Mainz – Frankfurt – Würzburg – Nürnberg
Intercity Express services (ICE 91) Hamburg – Bremen – Osnabrück – Dortmund – Düsseldorf – Cologne – Koblenz – Mainz – Frankfurt – Würzburg – Nürnberg – Vienna
Eurocity services (EC 7) (Kiel – ) Hamburg – Bremen – Osnabrück – Dortmund – Düsseldorf – Cologne – Koblenz – Mainz – Basel – Zürich ( – Chur)
Intercity services (IC 30) (Ostseebad Binz – Stralsund – Rostock / Westerland (Sylt) – Niebüll –) Hamburg – Osnabrück – Dortmund – Duisburg – Düsseldorf – Cologne – Mainz – Mannheim – Stuttgart
Intercity services (IC 31) (Kiel / Fehmarn-Burg – Lübeck –) Hamburg – Bremen – Osnabrück – Dortmund – Wuppertal – Cologne – Koblenz – Mainz – Frankfurt (Main) (– Würzburg – Nürnberg – Passau)
Intercity services (IC 77) Amsterdam - Amersfoort - Hengelo - Osnabrück - Hanover - Berlin
Intercity services (Flixtrain) Hamburg Hbf - Hamburg-Harburg - Osnabrück - Münster - Gelsenkirchen - Essen - Duisburg - Düsseldorf - Cologne
Regional services  Bremerhaven-Lehe - Bremen - Osnabrück
Regional services  Wilhelmshaven - Varel - Oldenburg - Cloppenburg - Bramsche - Osnabrück
Regional services  Rheine - Osnabrück - Minden - Hannover - Braunschweig
Local services  Osnabrück - Bramsche - Vechta - Delmenhorst - Bremen
Local services  Bad Bentheim - Rheine - Osnabrück - Herford - Bielefeld
Local services  Osnabrück - Münster
Local services  Osnabrück - Halle (Westf) - Bielefeld

Bus services

Many bus services depart from the bus station outside the station.

A coach shuttle service to Münster Osnabrück International Airport operates from the station, taking approximately 40 minutes to get from the railway station to the airport.

References

External links 

 Osnabrück Stadtwerke (local buses) German Only
 Hamburg-Köln Express website

Railway stations in Lower Saxony
Buildings and structures in Osnabrück
Railway stations in Germany opened in 1895